Up for You & I is the third album of Norwegian band Minor Majority, released in 2004.

Track listing
Think I'm up for you and I
Wish you knew
She gave me away
Premature way
I thought I knew
Take it in
A song for Nicole
The dark half
This time
Start a fire
Wonder if she knows

2004 albums
Minor Majority albums